Belford is a commuter town in the Hunter Region of New South Wales, Australia in Singleton Council.

Suburbs of Singleton Council
Towns in the Hunter Region